RED Air Flight 203 (L5203/REA203) was a scheduled international commercial passenger flight from Santo Domingo in the Dominican Republic to Miami International Airport by RED Air. On 21 June 2022, the McDonnell Douglas MD-82 aircraft operating the service suffered a left landing gear collapse and runway excursion, causing the left wing of the aircraft to impact an antenna structure, followed by a subsequent fire on the right side of the airplane. The incident caused three people to be hospitalized with minor injuries.

Aircraft 

The aircraft involved in the accident was a McDonnell Douglas MD-82 with the registration of HI1064 and serial number 53027. The aircraft was first delivered to American Airlines in December 1990, where it operated until August 2014. The aircraft was then stored until August 2017, when it was acquired by LASER Airlines. The aircraft had previously been painted in the Orange Air livery, but it never entered service with the airline. The aircraft was then transferred to RED Air, a subsidiary of LASER Airlines, in February 2021.

Passengers and crew 
There were 140 occupants on board the accident flight: 130 passengers and 10 crew members. Airport officials reported that all of them survived. The local fire rescue authorities reported that three people suffered minor injuries and were sent to the hospital.

Incident 

According to Flightradar24, RED Air Flight 203 departed from Las Américas International Airport in the Dominican Republic at 3:36 PM (19:36 UTC) and landed at Miami International Airport on runway 09 at 5:38 PM (21:38 UTC) after a flight time of two hours and three minutes on 21 June 2022. During landing, the aircraft's left main landing gear collapsed, causing the aircraft's left wing to scratch the runway. Just before the aircraft came to a full stop, the right landing gear and nose landing gear also collapsed, resulting in damage to the aircraft's nose and a fire on the right wing. Firefighters found fuel leaking from the aircraft when they arrived on scene. The aircraft had also reportedly collided with a communication tower and a small building before catching fire. Passengers began evacuating the plane about 5 seconds after the aircraft stopped and fled with their personal belongings. This became RED Air's first aircraft to be involved in a hull loss accident.

Footage of the incident 
The scene was captured by Miami International Airport's CCTV camera and the ground crew employee's cellphone. Two videos were subsequently released showing scenes onboard the aircraft during the landing and when the passengers were evacuating the aircraft. The footage was recorded by one of the passengers onboard. The first video shows the aircraft's harsh landing and the unusual vibrations before the left landing gear collapsed. The collapse of the left landing gear was heard at the end of the first video. The second video shows the passenger who recorded the footage exiting the aircraft. Another smartphone video was released, showing the moment inside the plane from touch down on the runway until the stop of the aircraft. This video shows just what the other onboard video shows, but this video also shows the passengers’ reactions during the incident.

Investigation

The National Transportation Safety Board (NTSB) arrived on scene the following day and began an investigation. A preliminary report issued by the NTSB cited four minor injuries to passengers, rather than the three originally reported by news outlets. The preliminary report stated that both flight recorders (data and voice) were recovered and their data was successfully downloaded by the NTSB. The NTSB also noted that the "left and right main landing gear were removed from the aircraft for further evaluation." A cause of the accident has not yet been reported by the NTSB.

Gallery

See also 
 DHL Aero Expreso Flight 7216
 Emirates Flight 521
 Tibet Airlines Flight 9833
 FedEx Express Flight 910

External links 
Preliminary Report, NTSB

References 

2022 in Florida
Accidents and incidents involving the McDonnell Douglas MD-82
Aviation accidents and incidents in the United States in 2022
Airliner accidents and incidents in Florida
June 2022 events in the United States
Miami International Airport